BGH commonly refers to Bovine growth hormone.

BGH or bgh may also refer to:

Business and Organizations
 BGH Capital, an Australian private equity company
 Borders General Hospital, Scotland
 Bristol General Hospital, England
 Federal Court of Justice, a German federal supreme court

Transportation
 Abbaye Airport, an airport in Mauritania with the IATA code BGH
 BH Air, a Bulgarian Airline based in Sofia with the ICAO code BGH
 Brighouse railway station, a railway station in West Yorkshire, England with the National Rail station code BGH

Other uses
 Bugan language (ISO 639 code bgh), China